Killafornia Organization is the only studio album by American West Coast hip hop supergroup, composed of Compton's Most Wanted's Tha Chill, Boom Bam and MC Eiht, South Central Cartel's Young Prodeje, Havoc & Prodeje, Wize Guyz' Boodro, Uni, Darren and Big Time, Hard Times' D.J. Raw, Boogieman and Shagman, the LBC Crew's Big Tray Deee, and rappers Bonaphyde, Killa and Dazzie Dee. The album peaked at number 88 on the Billboard Top R&B/Hip-Hop Albums chart in the United States. The album spawned a single "Throw It Up", which also made it to the Billboard charts, reaching #78 on the Hot R&B/Hip-Hop Songs and #11 on the Hot Rap Songs.

Track listing 

 Sample credits

 Track 13 contains original music of "Rumors" as written by Jay King
 Track 13 contains a sample from "Mr. Groove" performed by One Way

Personnel 

 Aaron Tyler – vocals, background vocals
 Austin Patterson – vocals
 Big Time – vocals, background vocals
 Bonaphyde Syso – vocals
 Boodro – vocals, background vocals
 Boogieman – vocals
 Brian C – guitar
 Cary Calvin – vocals
 Crazy Face – vocals, background vocals
 Darren Hubbard – keyboards
 Dazzie Dee – vocals
 D.J. Raw – scratches, keyboards, guitar, vocals
 Gene Heisser – vocals
 Hard Times – vocals
 Jason Jackson – scratches
 Jim O'Brian – guitar
 John Stary – talk box
 Kevin – background vocals
 Killa – background vocals, vocals
 Patrick Earl Pitts – vocals
 Raw – vocals, background vocals
  – background vocals
 Shagman – vocals
 Sly Fi Killa – vocals
 Tracy Lamar Davis – vocals
 Uneece – background vocals
 Uni – vocals
 Vernon Johnson – vocals, background vocals
 Wize Guyz – vocals

Charts

Album

Single

References

External links 
 
 
 Killafornia Organization on iTunes

1996 albums
Compton's Most Wanted albums